Camilleri is a common surname in Malta and, to a lesser extent, in Italy (most typically in Sicily). The surname is believed to have originated in the 12th century and derives from the Latin term "camelarius" (camel driver, cameleer).

Notable people with the surname include:
Andrea Camilleri, Sicilian writer
Antoine Camilleri, Maltese artist
Antoine Camilleri, Maltese Roman Catholic Church  official
Anya Camilleri, British film director
Catherine Camilleri (born 1982), Maltese footballer
Charles Camilleri, Maltese composer
Chris Camilleri, former Welsh rugby union and rugby league footballer
Darrin Camilleri (born 1992), American politician
David Camilleri, Maltese professional football (soccer) player
Davina Camilleri, better known as Davina Barbara, Gibraltarian radio and television presenter
Henry Camilleri (1933-2015), Maltese chess master
Joanne Camilleri (born 1982), Maltese pianist and harpsichordist
Joe Camilleri, Australian vocalist, songwriter and saxophonist
Joseph Camilleri, Egypt-born Maltese-Australian social scientist and minor philosopher
Katrine Camilleri (born 1970), Maltese advocate for refugees
Leslie Camilleri (born 1969), Australian murderer
Lisa Camilleri, Australian professional squash player 
Louis C. Camilleri, chairman and CEO of Philip Morris International
Margaret Camilleri, Maltese singer
Nazzareno Camilleri, Maltese philosopher, theologian and mystic
Pawlu Camilleri, Maltese harmonica musician
Ryan Camilleri, Maltese professional football (soccer) player
Stevie Camilleri, Maltese water polo player
Terry Camilleri, Australian actor
Trudy Camilleri, Australian football (soccer) player
Vincenzo Camilleri, Italian professional football (soccer) player

References

External link

Surnames
Italian-language surnames
Maltese-language surnames
Surnames of Italian origin